The Ape That Got Lucky was a four-part radio series broadcast on BBC Radio 4 in August 2005. Written by Chris Addison and Carl Cooper, it was based around Chris Addison giving a lecture on the evolution of man from "ugly ape" into the all time "Top Species".

Addison was supported in this spoof lecture by Professor Austin Herring, Emeritus Professor of Anthropology at St Dunstan's College Cambridge, who was played by Geoffrey  McGivern. The Professor was frequently ridiculed, and was usually introduced as the author of a particular book. The books were always amusingly titled, and were different in every introduction. Other cast members of the show were Jo Enright and Dan Tetsell who performed sketches to illustrate the lecture. The series was produced by Simon Nicholls.

Professor Herring gave the impression of being a prolific author, although his book titles were invariably absurd.  In the preamble to each show, Chris Addison would introduce the Professor as, for example: "...our resident expert...polymath...and author of many important scholarly works such as 'What are YOU looking at? – a sideways look at the origins of the squint' ...and... 'Here's looking at Euclid – geometry in the films of Humphrey Bogart' , as well as being editor of 'Pop Goes The Weasel – a treasury of vivisection anecdotes' ." For each of his contributions within the main show, The Professor himself would also mention an 'appropriate' paper he had written relating to the topic being discussed, also humorously titled.

In May 2006 The Ape That Got Lucky was awarded the Gold Sony Award for comedy. All four episodes were then released on a 2-CD set.

The April 2006 series Chris Addison's Civilisation is a follow-up to The Ape That Got Lucky; it has the same format and the same cast but the lectures focus on the building and making of a civilization rather than the evolution theme of this series.

External links
 
 Chris Addison's Website

2005 radio programme debuts
2005 radio programme endings
BBC Radio 4 programmes
BBC Radio comedy programmes